The Moment is the first  Mandarin solo LP by Aaron Yan of Taiwanese Mandopop quartet boy band Fahrenheit. It was released by HIM International Music on 19 December  2012. The Japanese edition was released on 6 March 2013 by Pony Canyon, which included the Japanese version of title track "" (The Moment). The LP consists of ten songs performed by Yan.

Track listing

Album version
不想忘記版 (Don't Want to Forget Ver.) (Pre-order), with calendar
永遠記得版 (Always remember Ver.) (Pre-order), with calendar
正式版 (Official Ver.)
私.日記版 (Private. Diary Ver.), with Photo Lyric book
日本初回限定版 (Japanese 1st limited ver.), with DVD of short movies "Valentine's Day, The Moment" and "Maybe You Still Love Me", and music videos "The Moment" and "Backup Life"
日本普通版 (Japanese Regular Ver.) with the song "The Moment (Japanese Version)"

Music videos
 "可能妳還愛我" (Maybe You Still Love Me) MV
 "紀念日" (The Moment) MV
 "換我陪妳" (My Turn to be With You) MV
 "原來" (Originally) MV
 "逾時不候的永恆" (The Late Eternity) MV

Charts

Taiwan

Hong Kong

Singapore

Malaysia

References

2012 albums
Mandopop albums
HIM International Music albums
Aaron Yan albums